Day of Reckoning is a 2016 American survival horror television film directed by Joel Novoa and starring Jackson Hurst and Heather McComb.

Cast
Jackson Hurst as David Shepperd
Heather McComb as Laura
Jay Jay Warren as Tyler
Hana Hayes as Maddy
Nick Gomez as Garrett Abare
Raymond J. Barry as Ted
Barbara Crampton as Stella
Randy Vasquez as Milton
Daz Crawford as Carl
Maz Siam as Ed
Luis Carazo as Fitzgerald
Ricardo Chacón as supervisor
Vaughn Wilkinson as guardsman
Timothy Charles Ryan Snyder as Ted's double

Production and filming
Filming for Day of Reckoning began in the first week of May 2016 in Los Angeles, California, following the agreement between the director Joel Novoa, screenwriter Gregory Gieras, and actors Jackson Hurst, Heather McComb, Hana Hayes, Jay Jay Warren, Raymond J. Barry, Barbara Crampton, Nick Gomez and Randy Vasquez. A television in the film includes scenes from Big Ass Spider! which shares the same screenwriter as Day of Reckoning.

Release
Day of Reckoning was released as a Syfy original and was shown as part of the channel's 31 Days of Halloween program in October 2016. On January 31, 2017, the film was released in North America as video-on-demand and digital through Epic Pictures.

Reception
Scott Clark of Starburst wrote "If the effects had been practical and the gore more heavily indulged in, there could have been a rip-roaring time to be had here; instead it's a dour-faced disposable which rambles through its runtime without evoking much reaction". Michelle Swope of Horror News gave the film a 2.5 out of 5, criticizing the plot and special effects, while praising Crampton's performance. The film also got a score of 30 out of a 100 from Culture Crypt.

References

External links

2016 films
2016 television films
American horror films
American survival films
2016 horror films
Films shot in Los Angeles
2010s American films